Boris Vallejo (born January 8, 1941) is a Peruvian-American painter who works in the science fiction, fantasy, and erotica genres. His hyper-representational paintings have appeared on the covers of numerous science fiction and fantasy fiction novels. They are also sold through a series of annual calendars.

Artwork
Born in Lima, Peru, Vallejo began painting at the age of 13, in 1954, and obtained his first illustration job three years later in 1957 at the age of 16. He attended the Escuela Nacional Superior Autónoma de Bellas Artes on a five-year scholarship, and was awarded a prize medal. After emigrating to the United States in 1964, at the age of 23, he quickly garnered a fan following from his illustrations of Tarzan, Conan the Barbarian, Doc Savage and various other fantasy characters (often done for paperback-fiction works featuring the characters). This led to commissions for movie-poster illustration, advertisement illustration, and artwork for various collectibles - including Franklin Mint paraphernalia, trading cards, and sculpture. Along with Julie Bell, Vallejo presents his artwork in an annual calendar and various books. Vallejo's work is often compared to the work of Frank Frazetta, not only because it is similar stylistically, but also because Frazetta painted covers for paperbacks of some of the same characters.

Vallejo's preferred artistic medium is oil on board, and he has previously used photographs to combine discrete images to form composite images. Preparatory works are pencil or ink sketches, which have been displayed in the book Sketchbook. He and Julie Bell have worked on collaborative artworks together, in which they sign the artwork with both names.

Vallejo has produced film posters for numerous fantasy and action movies, including Knightriders (1981), Q (1982), and Barbarian Queen (1985). He has also illustrated posters for comedies, notably National Lampoon's Vacation (1983), European Vacation (1985), Nothing But Trouble (1991) and Aqua Teen Hunger Force Colon Movie Film for Theaters (2007), co-created with Bell.

He created the 1978 Tarzan calendar. His sea serpent paintings hang in the queue of Loch Ness Monster, a rollercoaster at  Busch Gardens Williamsburg.

Awards
He received the British Fantasy Award for best artist in 1979 for his painting The Amazon Princess and her Pet. Vallejo also won the 2011 Chelsey Award for Lifetime Artistic Achievement, and the 2014 Chelsey Award for Best Product Illustration. He received the Inkpot Award in 1978.

Publications
Vallejo's published works include:

 The Fantastic Art of Boris Vallejo (1980)
 Mirage (1982, reprinted 1996 and 2001)
 Enchantment. Stories By Doris Vallejo, Illustrated by Boris Vallejo (1984)
 Fantasy Art Techniques (1985)
 Ladies: Retold Tales of Goddesses and Heroines. By Boris and Doris Vallejo (1992)
 Bodies: Boris Vallejo: Photographic Art (1998)
 Dreams: The Art of Boris Vallejo (1999)
 Titans: The Heroic Visions of Boris Vallejo and Julie Bell (2000)
 Sketchbook (2001)
 Twin Visions (2002)
 Fantasy Workshop: A Practical Guide (with Julie Bell) (2003)
 Boris Vallejo and Julie Bell: The Ultimate Collection (2005)
 The Fabulous Women of Boris Vallejo and Julie Bell (2006)
 Imaginistix (2006)

A yearly calendar of 13 paintings by Boris Vallejo and Julie Bell is produced by Workman Publishing.

References

External links

 

 

1941 births
Living people
20th-century American painters
20th-century American male artists
20th-century Peruvian male artists
21st-century American painters
21st-century Peruvian male artists
American illustrators
American male painters
Artists from Allentown, Pennsylvania
Fantasy artists
People from Lima
Peruvian emigrants to the United States
Peruvian male painters
Peruvian speculative fiction artists
Pin-up artists
Role-playing game artists
Science fiction artists
Inkpot Award winners